What's New was a Canadian news and current affairs television series for youth which aired on CBC Television from 1972 until at least 1989.

Premise
This series provided a summary of news items and features for a secondary school youth audience. Puppetry by Noreen Young was included on some segments for satiric sketches.

Scheduling
This half-hour series was broadcast for ten seasons as follows:

References

External links
 
 

CBC Television original programming
1972 Canadian television series debuts
1982 Canadian television series endings
1980s Canadian satirical television series
1980s Canadian television news shows
Canadian news parodies
Canadian television shows featuring puppetry